Kabudarahang County is in Hamadan province, Iran. The capital of the county is the city of Kabudarahang. At the 2006 census, the county's population was 137,919 in 32,178 households. The following census in 2011 counted 143,171 people in 38,426 households. At the 2016 census, the county's population was 126,062 in 37,567 households.

Administrative divisions

The population history of Kabudarahang County's administrative divisions over three consecutive censuses is shown in the following table. The latest census shows three districts, 10 rural districts, and three cities.

References

 

Counties of Hamadan Province